The 1950 Ulster Grand Prix was the fifth round of the 1950 Grand Prix motorcycle racing season. It took place on 19 August 1950 at the Clady Circuit.

500 cc classification

350 cc classification

250 cc classification

125 cc classification

References

Ulster Grand Prix
Ulster
Ulster
Ulster Grand Prix